Psilocybe heimii is a species of psilocybin mushroom in the family Hymenogastraceae. Described as new to science in 1978 by Gastón Guzmán, it is found in the subtropical forests of Mexico. It is named in honor of French mycologist Roger Heim.

See also
 List of psilocybin mushrooms
 List of Psilocybe species

References

External links
 

Entheogens
Fungi described in 1978
Psychoactive fungi
heimii
Psychedelic tryptamine carriers
Fungi of Mexico
Taxa named by Gastón Guzmán
Fungi without expected TNC conservation status